Orrs Run is a  long 2nd order tributary to Middle Wheeling Creek in Ohio County, West Virginia.  This is the only stream of this name in the United States.

Course 
Orrs Run rises in a pond about 2 miles east-southeast of Roneys Point, West Virginia, and then flows generally southeast to join Middle Wheeling Creek about 0.25 miles northeast of Camp Giscowhego.

Watershed 
Orrs Run drains  of area, receives about 41.1 in/year of precipitation, has a wetness index of 306.78, and is about 46% forested.

See also 
 List of rivers of West Virginia

References 

Rivers of Ohio County, West Virginia
Rivers of West Virginia